Plato Airport  is an airport serving the town of Plato in the Magdalena Department of Colombia. The runway is adjacent to the northwest side of the town.

See also

Transport in Colombia
List of airports in Colombia

References

External links
OpenStreetMap - Las Flores
OurAirports - Plato
Plato Airport

Airports in Colombia